Lala Begum is a 2016 Pakistani drama short film directed by Mehreen Jabbar, written by Syed Mohammad Ahmed and co-produced by Shailja Kejriwal, Mehreen Jabbar and Vikas Sharma.

Plot
The story revolves around the bitter relationship of two sisters, Meher (Marina Khan) and Seher (Sonia Rehman) in the 1970s. They have not been speaking to each other for the last 20 years. As Seher becomes widow, she returns home to claim her share of the family estate but Meher refuses to divide because she believes her sister brought dishonor to the family by marrying her husband, Ahmed and holds the grudge to this day. Meher has stayed single to honor her father’s legacy. According to him, if she were to marry, then a suitor could potentially swindle the family out of their estate. In order to protect it, she chose to be single. This sacrifice came with a sense of loneliness and estrangement. As for Seher, who believed in breaking the walls that Meher and her father put up in the family, things have not been hunky dory.  However, her situation and the opposition from her family left her helpless.

Cast
 Marina Khan as Meher / Lala Begum
 Sonia Rehman as Seher
 Jahanara Hai as Meher's mother
 Humayun Saeed
 Syed Mohammad Ahmed
 Shehryar Zaidi

Release

The film was premiered at Mosaic International South Asian Film Festival on 6 August 2016 under the Zeal for Unity banner. It is scheduled for public release on 4 November 2016.

Reception

Critical reception 
Lala Begum received a positive review from Swati Sharan of India.com after the film was premiered at MISAFF. She said ″Overall, Jabbar has manufactured a film with great tones of suspense alongside a revelation of how much precious time we waste hanging on to our false prestige without truly enjoying ourselves.″

References

External links

2016 short films
Pakistani drama films
2010s Urdu-language films
Mehreen Jabbar's directions
Pakistani short films
2016 drama films